The 1895 Orange Athletic Club football team was an American football team that represented the Orange Athletic Club in the American Football Union (AFU) during the 1895 college football season. The team played its home games at the Orange Oval in East Orange, New Jersey, compiled a 6–4–1 record (1–1 against AFU opponents), and shut out six opponents.

Schedule

Second team schedule

Consolidated team schedule

References

Orange Athletic Club
Orange Athletic Club football seasons
Orange Athletic Club football